Harry Jones (24 May 1891 – May 1947) was an English international footballer, who played as a left back.

Career
Born in Blackwell, Jones played professionally for Nottingham Forest, and earned one cap for England in 1923.

References

1891 births
1947 deaths
English footballers
England international footballers
Nottingham Forest F.C. players
English Football League players
English Football League representative players
Association football fullbacks